LaBerge may refer to:

People:

Charles Laberge (1827–1874), Quebec lawyer, journalist and political figure
David LaBerge (born 1929), neuropsychologist specializing in the attention process and the role of apical dendrites in cognition and consciousness
Édouard Laberge (1829–1883), physician and political figure in Quebec
Louis Laberge, OQ (1924–2002), French Canadian labour union leader
Mia LaBerge (born 1967), American artist who painted the first Steinway Art Case Piano created to honor a university
Robert de La Berge (1638–1712), born in France, went to Quebec in 1658; most LaBerges & LaBarges in the Americas are his descendants
Stephen LaBerge (born 1947), psychophysiologist and a leader in the scientific study of lucid dreaming
Walter B. LaBerge (1924–2004), aerospace engineer and defense industry executive, US Under Secretary of the Army 1977–1980

Places:
Lake Laberge, widening of the Yukon River north of Whitehorse, Yukon in Canada
Lake Laberge (electoral district), electoral district which returns a member to the Legislative Assembly of the Yukon Territory in Canada
Laberge River, a tributary of Hebert Lake, in Québec, Canada